The episodes for the fourteenth season of the anime series Naruto: Shippuden are based on Part II for Masashi Kishimoto's manga series. The season follows Naruto Uzumaki helping the ninja alliance fight against Kabuto's army. It was directed by Hayato Date, and produced by Pierrot and TV Tokyo. The season aired from January to July 2013. 

The English dub of the season began airing  on Neon Alley on May 30 to November 21, 2015. The season would make its English television debut on Adult Swim's Toonami programming block and premiere from May 17 to December 6, 2020. 

The season contains five musical themes between two openings and three endings. The first opening theme, "Moshimo" by Daisuke, is used from episode 296 to 306. The second opening theme,  by NICO Touches the Walls, is used from episode 307 to 320. The first ending theme,  by 7!!, is used from episode 296 to 306. The second ending theme, "I Can Hear" by DISH//, is used from episode 307 to 319. The third ending theme, by Rake, is used for episode 320.


Episode list

Home releases

Japanese

English

References
General

Specific

2013 Japanese television seasons
Shippuden Season 14